Chaudhary Sarfraz Afzal is a Pakistani politician who was a Member of the Provincial Assembly of the Punjab, from 2008 to May 2018.

Early life and education
He was born on 11 July 1975 in Rawalpindi. He then graduated in 2002 from Bahauddin Zakariya University and has a degree in Bachelor of Arts.

Political career
He was elected to the Provincial Assembly of the Punjab as a candidate of Pakistan Muslim League (N) (PML-N) from Constituency PP-6 (Rawalpindi-VI) in 2008 Pakistani general election. He received 40,626 votes and defeated a candidate of Pakistan Muslim League (Q) (PML-Q). In the same election, he ran for the seat of the National Assembly of Pakistan as an independent candidate from Constituency NA-52 (Rawalpindi-III) but was unsuccessful. He received 217 votes and lost the seat to Nisar Ali Khan.

He ran for the seat of the  Provincial Assembly of the Punjab as an independent candidate from Constituency PP-6 (Rawalpindi-VI) in 2013 Pakistani general election but was unsuccessful. He received 95 votes and lost the seat to Nisar Ali Khan.

He was re-elected to the Provincial Assembly of the Punjab as a candidate of PML-N from Constituency PP-6 (Rawalpindi-VI) in by-polls held in August 2013.  He received 30,065 votes and defeated Wasiq Qayyum Abbasi, a candidate of Pakistan Tehreek-e-Insaf (PTI).

In December 2013, he was appointed as Parliamentary Secretary for youth affairs, archaeology and tourism.

References

Living people
Punjab MPAs 2013–2018
1975 births
Pakistan Muslim League (N) politicians
Punjab MPAs 2008–2013